Annihilation, in physics, is an effect that occurs when a particle collides with an antiparticle.

Annihilation may also refer to:

Arts, entertainment, and media

Comics
Annihilation (comics), a Marvel Comics 2006 event featuring several cosmic characters
Annihilation: Conquest, a 2007 series featuring similar themes and marketed as a sequel of the above comic book series

Literature
Annihilation (Forgotten Realms novel), a 2004 novel by Philip Athans set in the Forgotten Realms universe
Annihilation (VanderMeer novel), a 2014 novel by Jeff VanderMeer and the first entry in the Southern Reach Trilogy

Films
Annihilation (film), a 2018 film based on VanderMeer's novel
Mortal Kombat: Annihilation, the sequel to Mortal Kombat

Games
 Annihilation, a map pack for Call of Duty: Black Ops

Music
Annihilation (album), 2001 Rebaelliun album
"Annihilation", a song from the album Dehumanization by Crucifix

Law 

 Family annihilation, the act of killing everyone in a family.

Logic and mathematics
 Annihilation, an operation in classical logic
 Creation and annihilation operators, mathematical operators utilized in the field of quantum mechanics

See also

"Annihilated", an episode from Law & Order: Special Victims Unit (season 8)
Annihilating element
Annihilationism, a minority Christian doctrine that the unsaved cease to exist rather than suffering conscious eternal torment in Hell
Annihilator (disambiguation)